The Papua New Guinea women's national football team is controlled by the Papua New Guinea Football Association (PNGFA). Its nickname is the Lakatois, which is a Motuan sailing vessel. Their home ground is the Sir Hubert Murray Stadium, located in Port Moresby and their current manager is Peter Gunemba. Deslyn Siniu is the team's most capped player and top scorer.

Papua New Guinea has never qualified for a FIFA Women's World Cup or the Olympic Games, but won the Pacific Games Football Tournament on five occasions (2003, 2007, 2011, 2015 and 2019) and won the 2022 OFC Women's Nations Cup and was runner up three times (2007, 2010 and 2014). They can be considered the second-best team in the Oceania Football Confederation after New Zealand.

Papua New Guinea's FIFA ranking as of December 2022 is 51. Their highest ever ranking was 46 in December 2019 and their worst ranking was 133 in September 2014.

History

1989–1998
Papua New Guinea played its first international game on 26 March 1989 in the Australian city of Brisbane facing the Australia B-side on the 1989 Oceania Cup. The match resulted in a 2–0 loss for the Papua New Guinean team. Geraldine Eka was Papua New Guinea's first scorer, in the lost game against Taiwan (6–1). In the two remaining matches, their rivals were New Zealand and Australia (senior team), with whom they lost both games. The Papua New Guineans finished on the bottom of the table, after being defeated in the four games.

The team participated on the 1991 and 1994 editions of the Oceania Cup, with the second being on home soil in the country's capital, Port Moresby. In both editions, they faced Australia and New Zealand, losing to them heavily. During that period, Papua New Guinea had its biggest loss, 16–0 with New Zealand. Both tournaments also served as the qualifiers for the first FIFA World Cup, held in China in 1991 and the second, in Sweden in 1995.

The Papua New Guineans won the 1996 Pacific Cup in Tonga with Miriam Lanta's help. In the same year, they managed to achieve their only draw with New Zealand.

The 1998 Oceania Cup in New Zealand saw a small improvement on the national team. They finished in the third position of the competition after beating Fiji 7–1 on the third place match. Other results include a victory over American Samoa and two defeats with Australia and New Zealand.

2000s
After 5 years without playing any games, Papua New Guinea re-appeared with coach Francis Moyap, in the 2003 Oceania Cup, celebrated in Australia during April 2003. The Papua New Guineans finished third once again. This edition included two new rivals: the Cook Islands and Samoa, teams which they defeated by 5–1 and 5–2, respectively. Midfielders Lydia Banabas and Glenda Matthies were notable players in this competition. Papua New Guinea had an average attendance of 412.5 people per match.

On the same year, the Papua New Guinean squad participated in the inaugural South Pacific Games women's football tournament, held in Fiji during June–July. This time, the national team achieved their biggest victory in their opening match, 13–0 over Kiribati, with Deslyn Siniu scoring a total of six goals for her country. With 13 points, thanks to four victories, one tie and one loss, Papua New Guinea won the gold medal in this competition. This time, the Papua New Guineans had an average attendance of 800 people per match.

Despite having won the Pacific Games tournament, the national team did a regular performance at the 2004 Olympic qualifying tournament, where it faced Australia and Fiji in a round-robin system competition.

The team appeared in the 2005 Arafura Games tournament, and finished with poor results.

Without Australia in the OFC, Papua New Guinea hosted the Oceania Cup again in 2007. All the games were played in Lae. This time, the team won against their neighbors, the Solomon Islands and Tonga (in fact, by an own goal scored by Tonga's Mele Vaisioa Mahe Niukapu). In the last game, the team lost the chance of qualifying to the 2007 FIFA Women's World Cup in China after losing to New Zealand.

The Papua New Guineans won their second gold medal in Samoa in the 2007 South Pacific Games. In the group stage, the team had very impressive victories (6–0 against American Samoa; 4–0 against the Solomon Islands; 4–1 against the Cook Islands) and a narrow loss (1–0 against Fiji). It advanced to the semi-finals along with Tahiti, and won 5–0, allowing them to advance to the final game, where they confronted Tonga at the Toleafoa J.S. Blatter Complex. After a hard game, Papua New Guinea won 3–1 after extra time with the help of Daisy Winas, Ara Midi and Lydia Banabas. The aforementioned was the national team's top scorer again, with a total of eight goals. Thanks to this result, the Papua New Guineans qualified for a play-off against New Zealand to determine Oceania's representative at the 2008 Summer Olympics in Beijing.

Papua New Guinea played the Olympic play-off qualifier on 8 March 2008, but they lost 2–0.

2010s
With an attendance of 60 people, the Lakatois started their 2010 Oceania Cup campaign facing Fiji at the North Harbour Stadium in Auckland, New Zealand. Papua New Guinea won the game 3–0 with a scoreline of 1–0 in the half-time. Both the second and third matches (2–1 against the Solomon Islands and 3–0 against Tonga, with an own goal of the Tongan goalkeeper Lupe Likiliki) resulted in victories. Papua New Guinea advanced to the semi-finals to beat the Cook Islands by 1–0. The final, played on 8 October 2010, saw the Kiwis and the Papua New Guineans struggling once again for the Oceania Cup title in front of an audience of 900 people. New Zealand finished as the champion for the fourth time, after thrashing Papua New Guinea 11–0. Zeena Limbai had a brilliant participation, after scoring four goals for PNG.

With one goal from Miriam Louma against Tahiti, the Papua New Guinean team started their 2011 Pacific Games road in New Caledonia, coached by Steven Mune. They achieved a second victory, against American Samoa, by 8–0, including an own goal. It was followed by a loss against the hosts, New Caledonia (2–1) and a victory over the Solomon Islands (1–0). The national team advanced to the semi-finals, where they faced Fiji, winning the game 4–0. In the gold medal/final game, the Papua New Guinean squad confronted the New Caledonians for the second time in the tournament. Christelle Wahnawe scored for the New Caledonians and Ara Midi and Linah Honeakii for the Papua New Guinean team, thus making 2–1 the final result. PNG received the gold medal for the third time.

PNG failed to qualify for the London 2012 Summer Olympics despite having a very good performance on the first stage of the qualifiers, played in Tonga from March to April 2012. They had an attendance average of 973.8 people per match.

With the former Australian footballer Gary Phillips as the squad's manager, Papua New Guinea started the 2014 OFC Nations Cup winning 4–1 on home soil, at the Kalabond Oval in Kokopo against the Cook Islands. The Lakatois were defeated by the Kiwis 3–0 in the second game. The tournament finished with a 3–0 win to Tonga. Meagen Gunemba was PNG's top scorer, with four goals, and goalkeeper Fidelma Watpore was awarded with the Golden Gloves.

The Lakatois had a tour on Southeast Asia in March 2015. They faced Singapore and Thailand.

The national team finished first in the Group B of the 2015 Pacific Games (on home soil), and had a victory against Samoa to advance to the final match, facing New Caledonia. Marie Kaipu gave the Papua New Guineans a fourth gold medal after scoring in the 21st minute.

The Lakatois' latest game was the 2016 Olympic qualifier against the Kiwis, which resulted in a 7–1 loss. A second leg was supposed to be played, but the Papua New Guinean team couldn't travel to New Zealand due to visa issues.

Team image

Nicknames
The Papua New Guinea women's national football team has been known or nicknamed as the "Lakatois (Motuan sailing vessel)".

Home stadium

Papua New Guinea play its home matches on the Sir Hubert Murray Stadium.

Results and fixtures

The following is a list of match results in the last 12 months, as well as any future matches that have been scheduled.

Legend

2022

2023

Papua New Guinea Fixtures and Results – Soccerway.com

Head-to-head record

Coaching staff

Current coaching staff

Manager history

Players

Current squad
The following players were called up for the 2022 OFC Women's Nations Cup from 13–30 July in Suva, Fiji.

Caps and goals as of 30 July 2022 after the match against .

Recent call-ups
The following players have been called up for the team in the last 12 months.

Previous squads
OFC Women's Nations Cup
2022 OFC Women's Nations Cup squad

Records

*Players in bold are still active.

Most capped players

Top goalscorers

Competitive record

FIFA Women's World Cup

Olympic Games

OFC Women's Nations Cup

Pacific Games

Pacific Cup

Arafura Games

See also

Sport in Papua New Guinea
Football in Papua New Guinea
Women's football in Papua New Guinea
Papua New Guinea women's national under-20 football team
Papua New Guinea women's national under-17 football team
Papua New Guinea men's national football team

References

External links
Official website
FIFA profile

 
Oceanian women's national association football teams